This is a list of cities and towns in the Kosovo in alphabetical order categorised by municipality or district, according to the criteria used by the Kosovo Agency of Statistics (KAS). Kosovo's population is distributed in 1,467 settlements with 26 per cent of its population concentrated in 7 urban areas, also known as regional centers, consisting of Ferizaj, Gjakova, Gjilan, Mitrovica, Peja, Pristina and Prizren.

The cities and towns in Kosovo belong to the following size ranges in terms of the number of inhabitants:
 1 city larger than 150,000: Pristina
 2 cities from 50,000 to 100,000: Gjilan and Prizren
 9 cities from 15,000 to 50,000: Ferizaj, Fushë Kosova, Gjakova, Mitrovica, Peja, Podujeva, Rahovec, and Vushtrri

List

See also 
Administrative divisions of Kosovo
List of populated places in Kosovo
List of populated places in Kosovo by Albanian name

Notes

References 

 
Kosovo
Kosovo